The 2022 Eastern Kentucky Colonels football team represents Eastern Kentucky University as a member of the ASUN Conference during the 2022 NCAA Division I FCS football season. They are led by Walt Wells in his third season. The Colonels played their home games at Roy Kidd Stadium. On August 28, Wells had a cardiac episode. The following day, Garry McPeek was named the acting head coach.

Previous season

The Colonels finished the 2021 season with 7–4 overall record, 4–2 in AQ7 conference play.

Schedule

Game summaries

at Eastern Michigan

at Bowling Green

Charleston Southern

at Austin Peay

Southern Utah

Sam Houston

North Alabama

at No. 15 Southeast Missouri State

Central Arkansas

at Jacksonville State

Kennesaw State

FCS Playoffs

Gardner–Webb – First Round

References

Eastern Kentucky
Eastern Kentucky Colonels football seasons
Eastern Kentucky Colonels football
Eastern Kentucky